Accordion Solo! is a 2005 album by Ten in the Swear Jar. It is the band's third release under that name, a complete discography derived from all their previous releases. It is released by Asian Man Records who described it as "A collection of live recordings, "field recordings" and studio tracks with complex lyrics, beautiful melodies, and diverse instrumentation." The live tracks are acknowledged to be of imperfect quality.

Jamie Stewart has re-used many lyrics from songs on Accordion Solo! in various Xiu Xiu songs.

AJJ covered "San Jose Fight Song" on their 2014 compilation Rompilation 2.0: The Digitizing.

Track listing
"Malafuquana Espana"  – 1:47
"Hot Karl"  – 3:04
"San Jose Fight Song"  – 4:20
"I Don't Play the Drumz"  – 4:13
"Gauntlet of Thor the Destroyer"  – 5:33
"Fort Awesome Drunk Tank"  – 0:52
"Helsabot"  – 3:21
"Famine"  – 4:32
"I Love the Valley"  – 3:39
"Leg Show"  – 4:14
"King Earth"  – 4:09
"Melon"  – 0:48
"When You Write"  – 3:58
"Worry Boy"  – 3:54
"Sita Deth"  – 3:31
"House Quake II"  – 3:56
"Sad Girl"  – 3:21
"In The Blue Trunks J.H."  – 3:28
"Accordion Solo!"  – 0:04
"Gauntlet of Thor the Destroyer (live)"  – 5:41
"I Love the Valley (live)"  – 3:21
"House Quake II (live)"  – 4:23

Explanation of tracks
1, 6, 12, 19 are field recordings
13 is a cover of the IBOPA (Indestructible Beat of Palo Alto) song of the same name (Stewart's previous band)
20-22 are live recordings from The Usual in San Jose, California

Re-usage of lyrics in Xiu Xiu songs 

 Lyrics in "Hot Karl" and "House Quake II" are reused in "Pink City" from A Promise
 Lyrics in "Helsabot" were later sung by Caralee McElroy in "Helsabot of Caraleebot", a b-side to "Fleshettes", and "Helsabot", from Fag Patrol
 Lyrics in "I Love The Valley" were later reused in "I Luv The Valley OH!" from Fabulous Muscles
 Lyrics in "King Earth" were later reused in "King Earth, King Earth" from Chapel of the Chimes and Fag Patrol
 Lyrics in "Sad Girl" were later reused in "Sad Pony Guerrilla Girl" from A Promise

Reception

Tiny Mix Tapes wrote, "Save the chirp 'n' croak of the unnecessary field recordings, Accordion Solo! presents a compelling alter ego to counteract the clucking of one of indie-rock's favorite chickens . . . [A] calculated, cocksure, and soiled like a bona fide dumpster mattress with all sorts of beautiful yellow, orange, and brown taint/mung stains."

Pitchfork Media wrote, "Accordion Solo! is the rare early-career document that works as a stand-alone record. One gets the sense that Stewart had yet to develop the confidence to be as melodramatic as he'd like, and Xiu Xiu detractors might find this preferable to the more realized recent work, while for neophytes, it will provide a valuable foothold on Stewart's daunting, alien terrain."

References

Accordion Solo!
Asian Man Records albums